Kazakhstan competed at the 2019 World Aquatics Championships in Gwangju, South Korea from 12 to 28 July.

Artistic swimming

Kazakhstan entered 14 artistic swimmers.

Women

Mixed

 Legend: (R) = Reserve Athlete

Open water swimming

Kazakhstan qualified three male and one female open water swimmers.

Men

Women

Swimming

Kazakhstan entered seven swimmers.

Men

Women

Water polo

Men's tournament

Team roster

Pavel Lipilin
Yevgeniy Medvedev
Maxim Zhardan
Roman Pilipenko
Miras Aubakirov
Altay Altayev
Murat Shakenov (C)
Yegor Berbelyuk
Stanislav Shvedov
Mikhail Ruday
Ravil Manafov
Yulian Verdesh
Valeriy Shlemov
Coach: Dejan Stanojević

Group B

13th–16th place semifinals

13th place game

Women's tournament

Team roster

Alexandra Zharkimbayeva (C)
Tomiris Kenenbayeva
Aizhan Akilbayeva
Anna Turova
Kamila Zakirova
Darya Roga
Anna Novikova
Darya Muravyeva
Anastassiya Yeremina
Zamira Myrzabekova
Anastasiya Mirshina
Viktoriya Khritankova
Azhar Alibayeva
Coach: Marat Naurazbekov

Group C

Playoffs

9th–12th place semifinals

Ninth place game

References

World Aquatics Championships
2019
Nations at the 2019 World Aquatics Championships